The Green–Left Coalition is a left-wing political alliance in Croatia represented by six MPs. It is composed of the We can! - political platform, New Left, Sustainable Development of Croatia, as well some City of Zagreb localist political parties and platforms, such as Zagreb is OURS!, and For the City (Za grad) movements. It promotes democratic socialism, green politics, and progressivism on social issues.

History
The coalition was formed in 2017 for the Zagreb local elections as the Left Bloc, where it won 4 out of 51 seats in the Zagreb local Assembly, and profiling itself as the most vocal opposition to mayor Milan Bandić and his local majority coalition with right-wing political subjects.

For the 2019 European Parliament election and upcoming July 2020 national parliamentary election in Croatia, members of the political alliance continue to collaborate. For the 2020 parliamentary election, the coalition changed its name into the current one. In the upcoming elections the coalition began rising in the polls from the start of campaign and receiving media coverage on daily basis. In June 2020 independent MP Bojan Glavašević joined the We can! - political platform and the coalition parliamentary election list.

Front-men of punk-rock Hladno Pivo, one of the most popular rock bands in country Mile Kekin and his wife Ivana (clinical psychologist) also joined the party list as socialists who were concerned with a lack of social policies in the established center-left SDP. Kekin also authored the song that was used for the coalition promotions titled "Happy People". Prominent theater maker and performer Mario Kovač also joined as the lead candidate of the list for diaspora (again through a performance action). The coalition's participation in the elections was also supported by a number of public figures, including musicians Damir Urban, Ljiljana Nikolovska and Davor Tolja, journalists Vedrana Rudan, Tomislav Jakić and Viktor Ivančić, multimedia artist Slaven Tolj, as well Bosnian conceptual artist and left-wing activist Damir Nikšić. To add to this, in the last week towards the elections new public figures used video to express support like actor and activist Jane Fonda or voting commitments from numerous individuals. The coalition also received support from the Democratic Socialists of America, the Party of the European Left, GUE/NGL and the European Greens, as well as political organizations from neighboring countries, such as The Left from Slovenia, United Reform Action from Montenegro, Social Democratic Union and Do not let Belgrade d(r)own from Serbia. The Coalition came fifth in the election, winning around 7% of the votes, and being granted 7 parliamentary seats in the 151-seat Croatian parliament. They celebrated their results at the MSU in Zagreb. During December 2020 Tomislav Tomašević of announced that Workers' Front is no longer member of coalition due the conflict with other parties.

Composition

Former members

Electoral performance

Parliament of Croatia

Zagreb City Assembly

European Parliament

References

2017 establishments in Croatia
Democratic socialist parties in Europe
Ecosocialist parties
Green political parties in Croatia
Left-wing political party alliances
Political parties established in 2017
Political party alliances in Croatia
Socialist parties in Croatia